Espaillat is the top female volleyball team of Espaillat.

History
The team was found in 2007.

Current volleyball squad
As of December 2008

Coach:  Ramón Cruz

Assistant coach:  Carlos Pérez

Palmares

National competition 
National league
 None

References
League Official website

Dominican Republic volleyball clubs
Volleyball clubs established in 2007